Cordula Trantow (born 29 December 1942 in Berlin, Germany) is a German actress and director. For her performance as Geli Raubal in the 1962 film, Hitler, she was nominated for a 1962 Golden Globe in the category Most Promising Newcomer - Female. Today, she works mostly as a stage actress and director. Her father was the film composer Herbert Trantow.

Selected filmography
 Mischief in Wonderland (1957)
 Die Brücke (1959)
  (1960)
 Tomorrow Is My Turn (1960)
 Sacred Waters (1960)
 Only the Wind (1961)
  (1961, TV film)
 Hitler (1962)
  (1963)
  (1968; TV miniseries)
 The Castle (1968)
 Dem Täter auf der Spur (1970; TV series)
 Unser Walter (1974; TV miniseries)
  (1975; TV film)
  (1977; TV film)
 Tatort:  (1979; TV series)
 Preußische Nacht (1981; TV film)
 Derrick: Das Floß (1994; TV series)
 Bella Block: Hinter den Spiegeln (2004; TV series)
  (2010; TV film)

External links

Ute Nicolai Agency Berlin 

German television actresses
Actresses from Berlin
1942 births
Living people
German film actresses
20th-century German actresses
21st-century German actresses